Southern Appalachia Railway Museum is a railway museum headquartered in Knoxville, Tennessee, United States.

History
The Southern Appalachia Railway Museum was founded in 1990. The museum collects antique locomotives and rolling stock to run on their 7 miles of track from the K-25 facility in Oak Ridge, Tennessee to an interchange with Norfolk Southern at Blair, Tennessee and back. The museum formerly ran an excursion train along this route using their rolling stock.   The ride runs over former Southern Railway trackage. The excursion train's name was the Secret City Scenic using Oak Ridge's nickname the "Secret City". The museum does an annual trip and railfan weekend. The excursion train typically ran on the first and third weekend of each month with the exception of special trains. A freight railroad still uses the tracks with the Scenic sometimes using some of the engines. The museum is currently restoring a Southern EMD E8 #6913 among other projects. The museum's ticket office is an old guard station that has been restored.

In 2000, the reuse committee of the Community Reuse Organization of East Tennessee approved a lease of land to the museum for a  visitor center, train depot and repair shop.

In 2016 the museum ceased passenger excursion train operations but continues the restoration and preservation missions while seeking out a new home for excursions.

Rolling stock

Units
 Seaboard Coast Line Railroad EMD SD45  2024 - currently lettered as Clinchfield Railroad 3632
Southern 6913 EMD E8
Wabash B905 ALCO C-424
U.S.A.E.C. 5310 1951 ALCO RS-1
U.S. Army 7100 1943 ALCO S-2
U.S. Army 7125 1943 ALCO S-2
L&N 1315 ALCO C-420
Georgia Central 3965 GE U23B
Southern Railway 2561 EMD GP30
L&N 1030 EMD GP30 that is currently lettered WRRX 1030

Passenger Cars
Central of Georgia coach no. 663 1947 ACF Coach
Central of Georgia coach no. 664 1947 Budd Coach "Fort Oglethorpe"
Central of Georgia coach no. 665 1947 Budd Coach "Fort McPherson"
Southern Railway no. 34 1928 ACF RPO
Southern Railway no. 543 1942 St.LCC Baggage Car
Southern Railway no. 2206 1949 Pullman sleeper "Roanoke Valley"
Southern Railway no. 3164 1926 Pullman dining car (on loan)

Freight Cars
Kansas City Southern no. 3763 1938 ACF Bulkhead Flatcar
Louisville & Nashville no. 6487 Caboose
Oneida & Western no. 9990 Caboose (on loan)
Savannah & Atlanta no. X253 Caboose
Southern Railway no. X261 1973 Gantt Manuf. Caboose
Speno no. SRBX-24 Boxcar, former Boston & Maine
Tennessee Valley Authority Flatcar

References

External links

History museums in Tennessee
Railroad museums in Tennessee
Heritage railroads in Tennessee
Museums in Knoxville, Tennessee